Hotel Storchen, in Zürich, is one of the oldest hotels in Switzerland, dating to 1357. It is first written about using the name "Haus zum Storchen" in the city tax archives.

The hotel offers attractive views, including from Wühre, which runs south along the river from this point.

2017 reconstruction 
In January 2017, 400 craftsmen were employed working in shifts over six days a week to completely renovate and modernize the hotel in just 6.5 weeks.

See also 
List of oldest companies

References

External links 

Homepage
Facebook page

Hotels in Zürich
Restaurants in Switzerland
Companies established in the 14th century
14th-century establishments in Switzerland